is a special ward in Tokyo, Japan. It is a major commercial and administrative centre, housing the northern half of the busiest railway station in the world (Shinjuku Station) and the Tokyo Metropolitan Government Building, the administration centre for the government of Tokyo. As of 2018, the ward has an estimated population of 346,235, and a population density of 18,232 people per km2. The total area is 18.23 km2.  Since the end of the Second World War, Shinjuku has been a major secondary center of Tokyo (fukutoshin), rivaling to the original city center in Marunouchi and Ginza. It literally means "New Inn Ward".

Shinjuku is also commonly used to refer to the entire area surrounding Shinjuku Station. The southern half of this area and of the station in fact belong to Yoyogi and Sendagaya districts of the neighboring Shibuya ward.

Geography

Shinjuku is surrounded by Chiyoda to the east; Bunkyo and Toshima to the north; Nakano to the west, and Shibuya and Minato to the south.

The current city of Shinjuku grew out of several separate towns and villages, which have retained some distinctions despite growing together as part of the Tokyo metropolis.

 East Shinjuku (or administratively called Shinjuku, Shinjuku-ku): The area east of Shinjuku Station and surrounding Shinjuku-sanchome Station, historically known as Naito-Shinjuku, houses the city hall and the flagship Isetan department store, as well as several smaller areas of interest:
 Kabukichō: Tokyo's best-known red-light district, renowned for its variety of bars, restaurants, and sex-related establishments.
 Golden Gai: An area of tiny shanty-style bars and clubs. Musicians, artists, journalists, actors and directors gather here, and the ramshackle walls of the bars are literally plastered with film posters.
 Shinjuku Gyo-en: A large park, 58.3 hectares, 3.5 km in circumference, blending Japanese traditional, English landscape and French formal style gardens.
 Shinjuku Ni-chōme: Tokyo's best-known gay district.
 Nishi-Shinjuku: The area west of Shinjuku Station, historically known as Yodobashi, is home to Tokyo's largest concentration of skyscrapers. Several of the tallest buildings in Tokyo are located in this area, including the Tokyo Metropolitan Government Building, KDDI Building and Park Tower.
 Ochiai: The northwestern corner of Shinjuku, extending to the area around Ochiai-minami-nagasaki Station and the south side of Mejiro Station, is largely residential with a small business district around Nakai Station.
 Ōkubo: The area surrounding Okubo Station, Shin-Okubo Station and Higashi-Shinjuku Station is best known as Tokyo's historic ethnic Korean neighborhood after World War II.
 Totsuka: The northern portion of Shinjuku surrounding Takadanobaba Station and Waseda University, today commonly referred to as Nishi-Waseda. The Takadanobaba area is a major residential and nightlife area for students, as well as a commuter hub.
 Toyama: A largely residential and school area, in the east of Ōkubo and south of Waseda University, extending to the area around Nishi-Waseda Station, Gakushuin Women's College and Toyama Park.
 Ushigome: A largely residential area in the eastern portion of the city.
 Ichigaya: A commercial area in eastern Shinjuku, site of the Ministry of Defense.
 Kagurazaka: A hill descending to the Iidabashi Station area, once one of Tokyo's last remaining hanamachi or geisha districts, and currently known for hosting a sizable French community.
 Yotsuya: An upscale residential and commercial district in the southeast corner of Shinjuku. The Arakichō area is well known for its many small restaurants, bars, and izakaya.

"Shinjuku" is often popularly understood to mean the entire area surrounding Shinjuku Station, but the Shinjuku Southern Terrace complex and the areas to the west of the station and south of Kōshū Kaidō are part of the Yoyogi and Sendagaya districts of the special ward of Shibuya.

Naturally, most of Shinjuku is occupied by the Yodobashi Plateau, the most elevated portion of which extends through most of the Shinjuku Station area. The Kanda River runs through the Ochiai and Totsuka areas near sea level, but the Toshima Plateau also builds elevation in the northern extremities of Totsuka and Ochiai. The highest point in Shinjuku is Hakone-san in Toyama Park, 44.6 m above sea level.

Districts and neighborhoods

Ushigome Area
 Ageba-chō
 Akagishitamachi
 Akagimotomachi
 Babashitamachi
 Bentenchō
 Enokimachi
 Fukuromachi
 Haraikata-chō
 Haramachi
 Higashienokichō
 Higashigoken-chō
 Ichigayachōenjimachi
 Ichigayadai-chō
 Ichigayafunagawaramachi
 Ichigayahachiman-chō
 Ichigayahonmura-chō
 Ichigayakaga-chō
 Ichigayakōrachō
 Ichigayanakano-chō
 Ichigayasadohara-chō
 Ichigayasanai-chō
 Ichigayata-chō
 Ichigayatakajōmachi
 Ichigayayakuouji-chō
 Ichigayayamabushichō
 Ichigayayanagi-chō
 Iwato-chō
 Kaguragashi
 Kagurazaka
 Kaitaichō
 Kikuichō
 Kitamachi
 Kitayamabushichō
 Kōdachō
 Minamienokichō
 Minamimachi
 Minamiyamabushi-chō
 Nakamachi
 Nakazatochō
 Nandochō
 Nijūkimachi
 Nishigoken-chō
 Nishiwaseda*
 Saikuchō
 Shimomiyabi-chō
 Shinogawamachi
 Shiroganechō
 Suidōmachi
 Sumiyoshi-chō
 Tansumachi
 Tenjinmachi
 Tomihisa-chō
 Toyama*
 Tsukiji-chō
 Tsukudo-chō
 Tsukudohachimanchō
 Wakamatsumachi
 Wakamiyachō
 Waseda-chō
 Wasedaminamimachi
 Wasedatsurumaki-chō
 Wasedamachi
 Yamabuki-chō
 Yaraimachi
 Yochō-machi*
 Yokoteramachi

Yodobashi Area
 Kamiochiai
 Kitashinjuku
 Nakai
 Nakaochiai
 Ōkubo
 Shimoochiai
 Takadanobaba
 Totsuka-chō
 Nishiochiai
 Nishishinjuku 
 Hyakuninmachi
 Kabukichō*
 Shinjuku*
 Toyama*
 Nishiwaseda*
 Yochō-chō*

Yotsuya Area
 Aisumichō
 Arakimachi
 Daikyōmachi
 Funamachi
 Kabukichō*
 Kasumigaokachō
 Katamachi
 Minamimotomachi
 Naitōchō
 Samonmachi
 Shinanomachi
 Shinjuku*
 Sugamachi
 Wakaba
 Yotsuya
 Yotsuyahonshiochō
 Yotsuyasakamachi
 Yotsuyasaneichō

History

In 1634, during the Edo period, as the outer moat of the Edo Castle was built, a number of temples and shrines moved to the Yotsuya area on the western edge of Shinjuku. In 1698, Naitō-Shinjuku had developed as a new (shin) station (shuku or juku) on the Kōshū Kaidō, one of the major highways of that era. Naitō was the family name of a daimyō whose mansion stood in the area; his land is now a public park, the Shinjuku Gyoen.  In 1898, the Yodobashi Water Purification Plant, the city's first modern water treatment facility, was built in the area that is now between the park and the train station.

In 1920, the town of Naitō-Shinjuku, which comprised large parts of present-day Shinjuku (the neighbourhood, not the municipality), parts of Nishi-Shinjuku and Kabukichō was integrated into Tokyo City. Shinjuku began to develop into its current form after the Great Kantō Earthquake in 1923, since the seismically stable area largely escaped the devastation. Consequently, West Shinjuku is one of the few areas in Tokyo with many skyscrapers.

The Tokyo air raids from May to August 1945 destroyed almost 90% of the buildings in the area in and around Shinjuku Station. The pre-war form of Shinjuku, and the rest of Tokyo, for that matter, was retained after the war because the roads and rails, damaged as they were, remained, and these formed the heart of the Shinjuku in the post-war construction. Only in Kabuki-cho was a grand reconstruction plan put into action.

The present ward was established on March 15, 1947 with the merger of the former wards of Yotsuya, Ushigome, and Yodobashi. It served as part of the athletics 50 km walk and marathon course during the 1964 Summer Olympics.  In the 1970s, the Yodobashi Water Purification Plant closed and was replaced by skyscrapers.

In 1991, the Tokyo Metropolitan Government moved from the Marunouchi district of Chiyoda to the current building in Shinjuku. (The Tokyo International Forum stands on the former site vacated by the government.)

Economy

The area surrounding Shinjuku Station is a major economic hub of Tokyo. Many companies have their headquarters or Tokyo offices in this area, including regional telephone operator NTT East, global camera and medical device manufacturer Olympus Corporation, electronics giant Seiko Epson, video game developer Square Enix,  fast food chains McDonald's Japan and Yoshinoya, travel agency H.I.S., Subaru Corporation (Subaru), railway operator Odakyu Electric Railway, construction giants Taisei Corporation and Kumagai Gumi, medical equipment manufacturer Nihon Kohden, Enoki Films, navigation software company Jorudan, instant noodle giant Nissin Foods, automotive components manufacturer Keihin Corporation, and regional airline Airtransse. The station area also hosts numerous major retailers such as Isetan, Takashimaya, Marui, Bic Camera, Yodobashi Camera and Yamada Denki.

Northeastern Shinjuku has an active publishing industry and is home to the publishers Shinchosha and Futabasha. The main store of the Books Kinokuniya bookstore chain is also located in Shinjuku.

Demographics
As of December 2017 Shinjuku had the highest concentration of non-Japanese citizens in Japan, and by 2012 people of Chinese citizenship became the most numerous foreign citizens in Shinjuku. Previously the most common citizenship was collectively those of North and South Korea.

Government and politics

Like the other special wards of Tokyo, Shinjuku has a status equivalent to that of a city. The current mayor is Kenichi Yoshizumi. The  consists of 38 elected members; the Liberal Democratic Party and New Komeitō Party together currently hold a majority. The Democratic Party of Japan, Japanese Communist Party and the Social Democratic Party are also represented together with four independents. Shinjuku's  is located on the southeastern edge of Kabukichō.

Shinjuku is also the location of the Tokyo Metropolitan Government. The governor's office, the metropolitan assembly chamber, and all administrative head offices are located in the Tokyo Metropolitan Government Building. Technically, Shinjuku is therefore the prefectural capital of Tokyo; but according to a statement by the governor's office, Tokyo (the – as administrative unit: former – Tokyo City, the area of today's 23 special wards collectively) can usually be considered the capital of Tokyo (prefecture/"Metropolis") for geographical purposes. The Geographical Survey Institute (Kokudo Chiriin) names Tōkyō (the city) as capital of Tōkyō-to (the prefecture/"Metropolis").

Elections
 2004 Shinjuku local election
 2006 Shinjuku mayoral election
 2007 Shinjuku local election

Transportation

Shinjuku is a major urban transit hub. Shinjuku Station sees an estimated 3.64 million passengers pass through each day, making it the busiest station in the world. It houses interchanges to three subway lines and three privately owned commuter lines, as well as several JR lines.

Rail
A list of railway lines passing through and stations located within Shinjuku includes:
 JR East
 Saikyō Line, Shōnan-Shinjuku Line: Shinjuku
 Tokyo Metro
 Marunouchi Line: Yotsuya, Shinjuku, 
 Yūrakuchō Line: Ichigaya, 
 Namboku Line: Iidabashi, Ichigaya, Yotsuya
 Tokyo Metropolitan Bureau of Transportation
 Toei Shinjuku Line: , Shinjuku-sanchōme, Shinjuku
 Toden Arakawa Line: Omokagebashi, Waseda
 Odakyu Electric Railway Odawara Line: Shinjuku
 Keio Corporation Keio Line, Keio New Line: Shinjuku
 Seibu Railway Seibu Shinjuku Line: , Takadanobaba, Nakai

Roads

Shuto Expressway:
 No.4 Shinjuku Route (Miyakezaka JCT - Takaido)
 No.5 Ikebukuro Route (Takebashi JCT - Bijogi JCT)

National highways:
 National Route 20 (Shinjuku-dōri, Kōshū-kaidō)

Other major routes:
 Tokyo Metropolitan Route 8 (Mejiro-dōri, Shin-Mejiro-dōri)
 Tokyo Metropolitan Route 302 (Yasukuni-dōri, Ōme-kaidō)
 Tokyo Metropolitan Route 305 (Meiji-dōri)

Education

Colleges and universities

 Chuo University graduate school
 Gakushuin Women's College

 Keio University Medical College
 Kogakuin University
 Lakeland College Japan
 Mejiro University
 Sophia University Mejiro Seibo Campus
 Tokyo Fuji University
 Tokyo Medical University
 Tokyo University of Science
 Tokyo Women's Medical University
 Waseda University

Schools

High schools
Public high schools are operated by the Tokyo Metropolitan Government Board of Education.

Shinjuku Yamabuki High School

Closed:
 

Private schools:
, private girls' school, affiliated with Gakushuin University and Gakushuin Women's College
, private boys' school
, private boys' school
, private girls' school
, private boys' school
, private boys' school, affiliated with Waseda University
Meijiro Kenshin Junior and Senior High School

Elementary and junior high schools

Public elementary and junior high schools in Shinjuku are operated by the Shinjuku City (the Shinjuku Ward) Board of Education (新宿区教育委員会).

Public institutions

Libraries
Shinjuku operates several public libraries, including the Central Library (with the Children's Library), the Yotsuya Library, the Tsurumaki Library, Tsunohazu Library, the Nishi-Ochiai Library, the Toyama Library, the Kita-Shinjuku Library, the Okubo Library, and the Nakamachi Library. In addition there is a branch library, Branch Library of Central Library in the City Office, located in the city office.

Hospitals
There are several major hospitals located within the city limits.

 Keio University Hospital
 Center Hospital of the National Center for Global Health and Medicine
 Tokyo Yamate Medical Center
 Tokyo Medical University Hospital
 Tokyo Women's Medical University Hospital
 Tokyo Metropolitan Health and Medical Treatment Corporation Ohkubo Hospital

Cultural centers

Museums
 National Printing Bureau Banknote and Postage Stamp Museum
 National Museum of Nature and Science, Shinjuku Branch
 Shinjuku Historical Museum
 Tokyo Fire Department Museum
 Tokyo Toy Museum

Halls
 Tokyo Opera City
 Shinjuku Bunka Center
 Meiji Yasuda Life Hall

Sister cities
Shinjuku has sister city agreements with several localities:

  Lefkada, Greece
  Mitte, Berlin, Germany
  Dongcheng District, Beijing, China
  Ina, Nagano, Japan

Notable people from Shinjuku-ku

Shinzo Abe, Prime Minister of Japan
Sugita Genpaku, physician and scholar
Ichirō Hatoyama, Prime Minister of Japan
Shinji Higuchi, filmmaker and storyboard artist
Wakaba Higuchi, figure skater
Minoru Kiuchi, politician
Yoshiko Kuga, actress
Tamiyo Kusakari, actress and ballet dancer
Yuichiro Nagai, professional footballer
Sanae Nakahara, actress
Ken Ogata, actor
Maya Okamoto, actress, voice actress and singer
Mineho Ozaki, paralympic athlete
Kōichi Satō, actor
Takuma Sato, professional racing driver
Shunsuke Shima, actor and voice actor
Kaoru Sugita, actress and singer
Jun Togawa, singer, musician and actress
Kōsuke Toyohara, actor and singer
Kyousei Tsukui, voice actor
Takashi Ukaji, actor
Atsuro Watabe, actor
Koji Yamamoto, actor and singer
Tatsuhiko Yamamoto, singer-songwriter and composer
Takeshi Yoshioka, actor
Kenichi Yoshizumi, politician and mayor of Shinjuku

See also

Citizens' Plaza, an urban space in Shinjuku
Tourism in Japan

References

 Shinjuku Ward Office, History of Shinjuku
 Hiroo Ichikawa "Reconstructing Tokyo: The Attempt to Transform a Metropolis" in C. Hein, J.M. Diefendorf, and I. Yorifusa (Eds.) (2003). Building Urban Japan after 1945. New York: Palgrave.

External links

 
 Shinjuku City Official website 
 Shinjuku Demographics 
The Shinjuku Historical Museum: a nicely arranged museum with interesting exhibits of Tokyo's past

 
Olympic athletics venues
Venues of the 1964 Summer Olympics
Wards of Tokyo